Sir Stafford Lofthouse Sands (23 September 1913 – January 23, 1972) was a former Minister of Finance of the Bahamas (1964–1967), who held other high positions in the islands until his self-chosen exile in 1967. He helped create the Bahamas' tourism industry and is credited with being an architect of Bahamian post-war prosperity. 

He has been dubbed the "Father of Tourism" in The Bahamas.

Sands was a lawyer who, from 1946, represented Wallace Groves and other Americans who sought to establish casinos, resorts, free-trade areas, and other developments in the islands, primarily at Freeport. From 1958, when party politics began, Sands had a prominent role in the United Bahamian Party (UBP), which was in power until 1967. The 1967 Royal Commission of Inquiry reported that Sands and the UBP received large payments, represented by Groves as "consulting fees," from the casino interests. Sands then permanently left the islands for exile in Spain, along with his considerable fortune.

His portrait appeared on the 10 Bahamian dollar note from 2001 until 2005, and again since 2010, while it was replaced by that of Queen Elizabeth II.

References

1913 births
1972 deaths
People from Nassau, Bahamas
Members of the House of Assembly of the Bahamas
Finance ministers of the Bahamas
United Bahamian Party politicians
20th-century Bahamian lawyers